= Comme un corbeau blanc =

Single by Johnny Hallyday

from the album Insolitudes
- Language: French
- English title: Like a white raven
- B-side: "La musique que j'aime"
- Released: 14 February 1973
- Recorded: 1972
- Genre: Pop rock, baroque pop
- Length: 3:09
- Label: Philips
- Songwriter(s): Jean Renard, Gilles Thibaut
- Producer(s): Jean Renard

Johnny Hallyday singles chronology
"Avant" (1972)	"Comme un corbeau blanc" (1973)	"Le feu" (1973)

Music video
- "Comme un corbeau blanc" on YouTube

"Comme un corbeau blanc" (translation: Like a white raven) is a song by French singer Johnny Hallyday. It was released as a single in February 1973 and included on his 1973 studio album Insolitudes.

== Composition and writing ==
The song was written by Jean Renard and Gilles Thibaut. The recording was produced by Renard. The single is backed by "La musique que j'aime" ("The music I like").

== Commercial performance ==
In France the single spent two weeks at no. 1 on the singles sales chart (in March–April 1973).

== Track listing ==
7" single Philips 6009 334 (1973, France etc.)

A. "Comme un corbeau blanc" (3:09)
B. "La musique que j'aime" (5:07)

== Charts ==
Chart (1973)	Peak position
France (Singles Sales)	1
